is a song by Japanese composer Go Shiina featuring Nami Nakagawa, released on August 30, 2019. It was used as an insert song of the TV anime series Demon Slayer: Kimetsu no Yaiba by Ufotable.

Composition and lyrics 
The composer Go Shiina, who is also involved in the production of anime gekitomo music, composed the song. Nami Nakagawa, who is in charge of vocals, participates as a chorus in various scenes in the animation, including the voice that flows in the subtitle of "Kimetsu no Yaiba".

The lyrics were written by Ufotable. It expresses the determination of the main character, Tanjiro Kamado, who stands up from despair and struggles to protect his younger sister Nezuko. Manga.Tokyo praised the song, commenting "it was a good way to finish the narrative about the Kamado siblings." The song was used in the climax scene and ending of episode 19 "Hinokami". 

In general, most of the inserted songs are only soundtrack collections that summarize BGM, but after the main animation broadcast, many voices requesting the full version of the single song reached the production side, and it became an unusual download sale of the inserted song.

Live performances
"Kamado Tanjiro no Uta" was performed for the first time on TBS TV "CDTV Live! Live! Christmas 4 Hours Special" which was broadcast live on December 21, 2020.  On December 30 of the same year, it was performed live at the same station's "62nd Shining! Japan Record Awards" and as a special project because Demon Slayer: Kimetsu no Yaiba won a special prize.

Charts

Certifications

References

External links 
 "Kamado Tanjiro no Uta" on Official Website 

2019 singles
Anime songs
Demon Slayer: Kimetsu no Yaiba